{{Infobox political party
| name = Debout la France
| country = France
| colorcode = 
| logo = Debout la France logo (2017).svg
| leader = Nicolas Dupont-Aignan
| leader2_title = Vice President
| leader2_name = Cécile Bayle de Jessé
| leader3_title = Vice President
| leader3_name = José Evrard
| leader4_title = Vice President
| leader4_name = Gerbert Rambaud
| leader5_title = Secretary-General
| leader5_name = Pierre-Jean Robinot
| split = Union for a Popular Movement
| founder = Nicolas Dupont-Aignan
| foundation = 
| dissolution = 
| headquarters = 55, rue de Concy 91330 Yerres93, rue de l'Université 75007 Paris
| ideology = 
| position = 
| national = 
| european = 
| europarl = 
| international = 
| membership =  22,000 (claimed)
| membership_year = 2018
| slogan = 
| colours =    Blue, White, Red (French Tricolore)   Blue (customary)
| blank1_title = Members
| blank1 = 
| seats1_title = National Assembly
| seats1 = 
| seats2_title = Senate
| seats2 = 
| seats3_title = European Parliament
| seats3 = 
| seats4_title = Presidency of Regional Councils
| seats4 = 
| seats5_title = Presidency of Departmental Councils
| seats5 = 
| website = 
| footnotes = Constitution of FranceParliament; government; president
}}

Debout la France (DLF) is a French political party founded by Nicolas Dupont-Aignan in 1999 under the name Debout la République (Republic Arise, DLR) as the "genuine Gaullist" branch of the Rally for the Republic (RPR). It was relaunched again in 2000 and 2002 and held its inaugural congress as an autonomous party in 2008. At the 2014 congress its name was changed to Debout la France.

It is led by Nicolas Dupont-Aignan, who holds the party's only seat in the French National Assembly. Dupont-Aignan contested the 2012 presidential election and received 644,043 votes in the first ballot, or 1.79% of the votes cast, finishing seventh. In the 2007 presidential election, he had failed to win the required 500 endorsements from elected officials to run. He dropped out without endorsing any candidate. However, he was re-elected by the first round of the 2007 legislative election as a DLF candidate in his home department of Essonne.

The party was a member of EUDemocrats, a Eurosceptic transnational European political party. In 2019, for the European elections, the party joined forces with the CNIP to form an alliance named Les Amoureux de la France ("The Lovers of France"), and announced its alliance with the European Conservatives and Reformists.

Popular support and electoral record
DLF's electoral support is concentrated in Dupont-Aignan's department of Essonne, where the DLF list polled 5.02% in the 2009 European Parliament election and it polled up to 36.14% in his hometown of Yerres. The party also polled well in the Île-de-France region (2.44%), the North-West (2.4%) and the East constituency (2.33%), owing the regions' conservative and Gaullist departments.

In the 2012 presidential election, Dupont-Aignan obtained 1.79% of votes at the first round and did not endorse any candidate in the second. In the following legislative elections, Dupont-Aignan was elected to the National Assembly in Essonne's 8th constituency.

The European election of 2014 saw an the party increase its share of the popular vote to 3.82%, although it failed to elect any MEPs.

Dupont-Aignan was again the party's candidate in the 2017 presidential election, obtaining 4.73% of the vote in the first round. He then endorsed the National Front's candidate Marine Le Pen in the second round. In the following legislative elections, Dupont-Aignan was re-elected to the National Assembly.

Ideology and positions
During the 2012 French presidential election, the party defined itself as representing social Gaullism and an alternative to the left-right divide. When founding the party, Dupont-Aignan positioned it to the right of what he calls the "UMPS" (a neologism of the former centre-right Rally for the Republic and the centre-left  Socialist Party) but not as hardline as the French National Front, which he summed up with the slogan Neither system nor extreme.''

The party has been defined by the media and political analysts as conservative, nationalist, populist and Gaullist. It is generally positioned on the right-wing and sometimes far-right of the political spectrum, although the party and members of the French Council of State have disputed the latter label.

The party has advocated that France should leave the Eurozone and takes a highly critical stance of the European Union, denouncing what it regards as globalism against French identity and argues that France should reclaim sovereignty it regards as lost to the EU. It also calls for strict border controls, regulation of immigration and the reopening of penal colonies for violent criminals and convicted terrorists.

On economic matters, the party takes a largely protectionist attitude (including offering tax incentives for businesses to remain in France) and supports nationalizing the French highway system, which last till 2020.

Elections

Presidency

European Parliament

Regional Parliament

Elected officials
Nicolas Dupont-Aignan (Essonne) is the only DLF member of the National Assembly. The party also claims 3 general councillors, and Mayors in four communes: Yerres, Cambrai, Saint-Prix and Ancinnes.

References

External links
Official website

 
Right-wing populist parties
Right-wing populism in France
2008 establishments in France
Conservative parties in France
French nationalist parties
Eurosceptic parties in France
Gaullist parties
National conservative parties
Political parties established in 2008
Political parties of the French Fifth Republic
Right-wing parties in France